Jutta Nardenbach (13 August 1968 – 8 June 2018) was a German international footballer. She played the position of defender. Nardenbach was player in the first team and coach of the youth teams at third tier FFC Montabaur.

Club career

Nardenbach played in the Bundesliga for TuS Ahrbach, TuS Niederkirchen, TSV Siegen, FC Rumeln-Kaldenhausen, SC 07 Bad Neuenahr, 1. FFC Frankfurt, and SG Essen-Schönebeck. She retired from the Bundesliga in 2004, contracting for the 2006/07 season as coach for FFC Montabaur in the Regionalliga and also played in the first team. In addition, she worked for several years for a sports shop in Ruppach-Goldhausen in club customer services.

Nardenbach had appearances in 5 German Championship finals and won in 1991, 1992, 1994 each with TSV Siegen. In 1993 she also won the DFB-Pokal with TSV Siegen. In her time at FFC Frankfurt she won back to back Doubles in 2001 and 2002. Also in 2002 she won the UEFA Women's Cup with Frankfurt.

National team

Nardenbach had 59 appearances for Germany, scoring 4 times. Her first cap was against the Netherlands on 19 November 1986. Her last game was against Brazil on 25 July 1996. Her greatest successes were the European Championships in 1989 and 1991. At the FIFA World Cup in 1991 she placed 4th with Germany.

Honours

German Championship: 1991, 1992, 1994, 2001, 2002
DFB-Pokal: 1993, 2001, 2002
UEFA Women's Cup: 2002
European Championship: 1989, 1991

References

External links
Homepage of 1. FFC Montabaur

1968 births
2018 deaths
People from Bendorf
Footballers from Rhineland-Palatinate
FCR 2001 Duisburg players
1. FFC Frankfurt players
SC 07 Bad Neuenahr players
SGS Essen players
Women's association football defenders
German women's footballers
Germany women's international footballers
1991 FIFA Women's World Cup players
Footballers at the 1996 Summer Olympics
Olympic footballers of Germany
UEFA Women's Championship-winning players